The 1991 European Women's Cricket Championship (Dutch: Europees Kampioenschap Dames Cricket 1991) was an international cricket tournament held in the Netherlands from 16 to 20 July 1991. It was the third edition of the Women's European Championship, and all matches at the tournament held One Day International (ODI) status.

Four teams participated, with the hosts, the Netherlands, joined by the three other European members of the International Women's Cricket Council (IWCC) – Denmark, England, and Ireland. A round-robin format was used, with the top two teams proceeding to the final. England was undefeated in the round-robin stage and beat Denmark by 179 runs in the final, winning the championship for the third time in a row. The tournament was marked by low scoring, with the seven matches yielding only two individual half-centuries and one team score over 200. England's Wendy Watson led the tournament in runs for a third consecutive time, while her teammate Jo Chamberlain was the leading wicket-taker. All matches at the tournament were played in Haarlem, at the Sportpark Koninklijke HFC.

Squads

Round-robin

Points table

Source: CricketArchive

Fixtures

Final

Statistics

Most runs
The top five run scorers (total runs) are included in this table.

Source: CricketArchive

Most wickets

The top five wicket takers are listed in this table, listed by wickets taken and then by bowling average.

Source: CricketArchive

References

1990
International women's cricket competitions in the Netherlands
1991 in women's cricket
International cricket competitions from 1988–89 to 1991
July 1991 sports events in Europe
1991 in English cricket
cricket
cricket
cricket
cricket